Lon Clark (January 12, 1912 – October 2, 1998) was a New York City actor of stage and radio.

Clark was born in Frost, Minnesota. As a youth in Minnesota, Clark studied at the MacPhail Center for Music in Minneapolis. He began as a musician and actor in traveling tent shows, followed by a season with the Cincinnati Summer Opera. After participating in radio drama in Cincinnati, he arrived in New York during the 1940s, and his rich baritone voice quickly led to network radio roles.

Radio
He had the title role in Nick Carter, Master Detective on the Mutual Broadcasting System from 1943 to 1955. The Nick Carter scripts were by Alfred Bester and others. Clark also played the district attorney in Front Page Farrell.

Clark was also a familiar voice on such programs as the weekday serial Mommie and the Men, the frontier serial adventure Wilderness Road, the World War II dramas Words at War (1943–45) and Soldiers of the Press (1942–45), the quiz show Quick as a Flash, the soap opera Bright Horizon, the science fiction series 2000 Plus and Exploring Tomorrow, Lights Out, The Mysterious Traveler, The Kate Smith Hour, The March of Time, The Adventures of the Thin Man and Norman Corwin Presents, playing opposite such performers as Fred Allen, Art Carney, Helen Hayes and Orson Welles.

Broadway
Clark returned to the stage in his later years, replacing Jason Robards in the 1956 Broadway production of Eugene O'Neill's Long Day's Journey into Night. He was back on Broadway in the short run of Sidney Sheldon's Roman Candle with Inger Stevens and Julia Meade.

Death
He was 86 when he died at St. Clare's Hospital in Manhattan, survived by his wife, Michelle Trudeau Clark; two sons, Lon Jr. and Stephen, both of San Francisco; a brother, Gerald, of Plymouth, Minnesota; and a grandson.

References

External links

 

1912 births
1998 deaths
American male radio actors
Male actors from Minneapolis
People from Faribault County, Minnesota
20th-century American male actors